Apsley Shire was a local government area in the New England region of New South Wales, Australia.

Apsley Shire was proclaimed on 7 March 1906, one of 134 shires created after the passing of the Local Government (Shires) Act 1905.

The shire offices were based in Walcha.

The Shire was amalgamated with the Municipality of Walcha to form Walcha Shire on 1 June 1955.

References

Former local government areas of New South Wales
1906 establishments in Australia
1955 disestablishments in Australia